Lolita Lempicka (real name Josiane Maryse Pividal in Bordeaux, 1954) is a French fashion designer and perfumer.

Early life 

An admirer of her mother's work as a seamstress, Lolita Lempicka dressed Barbie dolls herself at the age of six; as a teenager she crafted her own clothes. By 17 Lolita was studying fashion design at Studio Berçot.

Career 

From the age of six Lempicka was fascinated by wonderlands full of princesses and sumptuous dresses. She was inspired by fairy tales, such as Beauty and Beast, Peau d'Âne, and other tales of Charles Perrault, as well as fashion magazines such as Femmes d'Aujourd'hui and Marie Claire.
When designing her collections, she drew inspiration from Coco Chanel, whom she discovered on French TV show Dim Dam Dom. Her inspiration was also drawn from the work of artists such as the photographer David Hamilton, the poet Jean Cocteau, pre-Raphaelite and symbolist painters, as well as Amedeo Modigliani, Picasso, Matisse, Gustave Moreau and Ingres. Lempicka's designs are also influenced by "the thirties and forties and their lace and silk negligee dresses, 18th-century Baroque and its dainty marchionesses".
Her signature ivy leaf symbol is drawn from her interest in fairytales and nature.

Lolita began her career as an independent designer. In 1983, at 29, she presented her first collection with the help of her husband.
In 1984, she opened the first Lolita Lempicka shop in the Marais district in Paris. That year, she also held her first fashion show in Tokyo, Japan.
In 1985, Lempicka held her first fashion show in Paris.
In 1986, she launched "Lolita Bis", a collection dedicated to young women.
From 1987 to 1990, she was artistic director at Cacharel in charge of the Women and Children lines.
In 1987, she started a long lasting partnership with the Japanese group Onward Kashiyama for a master license including fashion clothes and accessories (leather,
sun glasses, jewelry, shoes, and lingerie).
In 1990, she established her own fashion house in a townhouse on Avenue Marceau in Paris.
In 1990 her collection was shown in a courtyard in the Louvre.
Throughout the 1990s, she designed special collections for La Redoute, Trois Suisses or Monoprix.
In 1994, Lolita Lempicka designed a collection dedicated to brides-to-be and opened another shop in the Marais district dedicated to wedding dresses, Les Mariées de Lolita. Wedding dresses play an important role in the designer's creative universe.
In 1996, Lolita Lempicka launched LSD (Lolita Studio Design), a new casual and affordable fashion line. That year, her eldest daughter Elisa Melodie joined the fashion studio and started collaborating actively in the design of new collections.
1997 saw the introduction of Lempicka's first fragrance, "Lolita Lempicka", inspired by fairytales from her childhood.
In the early 2000s, Pedro Winter, the Parisian music producer of Daft Punk and DJ, arranged the music of her fashion shows. 
In 2003, after studying art and fashion, Lolita's twins Lauren Leslie and Paulina Leonor joined the family business.
In 2004, Lolita Lempicka celebrated 20 years of creation. On that occasion she published a book celebrating 20 years of design (« Lolita Lempicka : 20 ans de création"). That year, Lolita Lempicka associated her name with a premium car: Nissan Micra "Lolita Lempicka ». The partnership continues to-date, and three versions, including a convertible, were created since.
In 2006, she resumed her partnership with La Redoute for a capsule collection. 
In 2007, she created a fashion clothes and lingerie line for Etam. That year, Lempicka also partnered with Nissan Motor Company to reinvent the Nissan Micra.
In 2008, she launched another collection, including a wedding dress, for Trois Suisses. This year also saw the first year Lempicka designed a Samsung mobile phone.
In 2009, she expanded her partnerships with luggage maker Delsey and organic product creator Bonneterre (tea, biscuits, chocolates) with Les Gourmandises de Lolita Lempicka.
2011 saw the second mobile phone partnership with Samsung by Lempicka.
In 2012, she designed a capsule collection (fashion clothes and accessories) for the organic and ethical brand Ekyog.

Perfumes 

During Lolita Lempicka's successful career in fashion design, she was brought to international fame by the launch of her legendary perfume "Lolita Lempicka", or "Le Premier Parfum".
Launched in 1997 with a bottle in the shape of an apple, "Lolita Lempicka" has been at the top of the world's perfume sales ever since.
In 2000 was released her first fragrance for men: "Lolita Lempicka au Masculin". 
In 2006 the mermaid-inspired "L" was created.
In 2008, Lolita Lempicka released "Fleur Défendue" (Forbidden Flower) and "Fleur de Corail" (Coral Flower) inspired by her two first fragrances.
In 2009, Lolita Lempicka launched "Mon Rose".
The same year, Lolita Lempicka Perfumes opened their online store.
In the fall of 2009, "Si Lolita" was launched and quickly became the third most successful feminine fragrance. Packaged in a four leaf clover-shaped bottle, "Si Lolita" explored new horizons in Lolita Lempicka's range of fragrances. The perfume muse was Charlotte Le Bon, the weather girl from Canal +, France premium TV channel.
In 2010, "Lolita Lempicka au Masculin" fragrance was made available in eau de toilette "L'Eau Au Masculin". "Si Lolita" was also made available in Eau de Toilette in 2011.
In 2012, the brand launched the first edition of "L'Eau en Blanc". 
In September 2012, Elle Fanning was chosen by Lolita Lempicka as the new face for "Le Premier Parfum". She stars in a new campaign, created by Yoann Lemoine, along with Woodkid.
In September 2013, Lolita Lempicka launched Elle L'Aime, an incandescent white floral fragrance. The face of the fragrance is the model Sasha Pivovarova.
In 2017, after 20 years of success, Mon Premier Parfum begins its most exciting period, that of its metamorphosis, affirmation, and challenges. The famous apple of Eden reveals modern forms and new facets. This jewel-bottle conceived as a piece of art also sublimates Sweet and So Sweet, Mon Eau and Elixir Sublime perfumes.
The model and actress Thylane Blondeau is the new face of Mon Premier Parfum. She is the embodiment of the new millennium Lolita: an obvious beauty, assumed and connected.
At spring 2018, Lolita Lempicka launches Mon Eau, a fruity floral eau de parfum with breathtaking freshness. In an eco-friendly approach, Mon Eau meets its commitment to the respect and protection of the environment and animals by being labeled vegan "One Voice ».

Marketing 

Lolita Lempicka has dressed many French actresses, such as 
Charlotte Gainsbourg and Anouk Grinberg in the film "Merci La Vie", 
Vanessa Paradis in "L'Arnacoeur" (Heartbreaker), Victoria Abril in "Gazon Maudit" (French Twist), and Mathilde Seigner in "Mariages!" (Marriages!).
She also invited many actresses to wear her creations at fashion shows, such as Diane Kruger, Clotilde Courau, Élodie Bouchez, Emmanuelle Seigner, Laetitia Casta, Florence Thomassin, Marine Delterme, Valérie Kaprisky, Charlotte Valandrey, and Geraldine Pailhas.
The brand is also regularly worn on the red carpet in Cannes. Lolita Lempicka has dressed Élodie Bouchez, Isabelle Huppert, Emmanuelle Béart, Chiara Mastroianni, Josiane Balasko, Laetitia Casta, Béatrice Dalle, Cécile Cassel, and Roxane Mesquida for the occasion in the past.

Awards and honors
In 2002, Lolita Lempicka became a Chevalier of the Legion of Honor.

Advocacy
In 2014, Lempica appeared on La Nouvelle Edition on Canal+ to discuss her opposition to Air France's transport of monkeys to laboratories which she called a "waking nightmare" for the animals. In a letter to Air France, she wrote that she has instructed her employees to boycott the airline.

Personal life
Lempica married Joseph-Marie Pividal, a graphic designer.
Lempicka has built her brand as a family business. Lolita's three daughters Elisa Melodie (born 1975), and twin daughters Paulina Leonor and Lauren Leslie (1983) are all actively involved in Lolita Lempicka. Melodie lives in New York and is responsible for the brand in the United States, while Leonor and Leslie work closely with their mother in Paris. Lempicka herself has appeared in the movies "Prêt-à-porter" and "Quelqu'un De Bien" (Slice of Life).

References

Further reading
Tiffy Morgue and Jean-Yves Gaillac, Lolita Lempicka: 20 ans de création : 20 years of creation, Editions de la Martinière, October 2004, 141 p.

1954 births
Artists from Paris
Chevaliers of the Légion d'honneur
French fashion designers
French women fashion designers
Living people